These Kids Wear Crowns is a six-member Canadian power pop and pop-rock band, formed in 2009 in Chilliwack, British Columbia, Canada. They were "discovered" on MuchMusic's disBand and signed to a contract with Capitol Records/EMI. They have performed with acts such as Hedley, Faber Drive, Forever the Sickest Kids, Good Charlotte and Lights. The band's debut single and music video "Break It Up" debuted at No. 60 on the Canadian Hot 100. They re-issued their EP on August 31, 2010.

In Fall 2010, These Kids Wear Crowns returned to the studio to record their full-length album, entitled Jumpstart, which was released on March 1, 2011.  One of the singles released was a cover of the Whitney Houston song "I Wanna Dance With Somebody (Who Loves Me)" featuring Mexican actress and singer, Eiza González.

Members

Current members

Alexander Johnson - Lead vocals (2009–present)
Alan Poettcker - Bass Guitar, vocals (2009–present)
Matt Vink - Keyboards, Synthesisers, backing vocals (2009–present)
Joe Porter - Guitar, backing vocals (2009–present)
Joshua "Gypsy" McDaniel - Guitar, backing vocals (2009–present)
Josh Mitchinson - Drums (2009–present)

History

Formation and Jumpstart
Alex and Alan knew each other from high school, where they wrote songs together. Following a several year hiatus, in which Alex recorded some tracks as a rapper and Alan continued to hone his producing skills, they recorded a short EP as Goodnight Moon, but it was never released.   Shortly after completing that CD, Alex and Alan formed Goodnight Medic along with Matt Vink, Brad Fry and Mark Sawatzky. Goodnight Medic placed in the top 10 of the 2008 Fox Seeds contest, but broke up in February 2009 via a Facebook announcement, stating "We will be back again in the form of something great and new." Following the departure of Brad and Mark, Alex, Alan, and Matt formed a new group, recruiting guitarist Joe Porter. Drummer Josh Mitchinson found out about the project via MySpace and joined These Kids Wear Crowns as named by Matt. In summer 2009, TKWC recorded their original EP, recorded and produced at the Sound Suite in Abbotsford, British Columbia. The original EP was released on September 11, 2009. In Fall 2009, the band went on a cross-Canada tour with fellow Vancouver-area band A Trophy Life. During this tour, they received news that they were selected to appear on MuchMusic's disBand in Toronto, Ontario. Needing a second guitarist, they recruited A Trophy Life's guitarist Joshua "Gypsy" McDaniel.

They then appeared on disBand, receiving a "thumbs up" on the show. Later one of the judges from disBand, Mark Spicoluk visited the band in their home town, Chilliwack, British Columbia to attend a local concert. After TKWC was invited to perform at the showcase back in Toronto. This gained them interest from TQ Management and SL Feldman and Associates, in addition to numerous record labels. In early 2010, they traveled to Texas to record tracks. In April 2010, they shot their video for "Break it Up". In May 2010, they were the opening act for the Western Canadian leg of Faber Drive's "Can't Keep a Secret Tour" alongside Jesse Labelle and The Latency. In June 2010, they headlined their own tour dubbed "The Not Really a Tour Tour" with shows in Alberta, Saskatchewan, and Ontario. In August 2010, it was announced that they would join Hedley on their "The Show Must Go on the Road Tour" alongside Lights and San Sebastian during September 2010.  In September 2010, they filmed a video for "Skeletons", which was set to be released as the next single. On November 30, 2010, they released their original Christmas track "Red White and You" as an iTunes exclusive single.

In August 2010, they began recording their debut full-length album "Jumpstart", which will feature many new tracks in addition to a reworked version of "We All Fall Down" which was a track which appeared on the original EP, alongside "Break it Up", and "Skeletons". Jumpstart was released on March 1, 2011. The lead-off single is the title track "Jumpstart", which they first performed in November 2010. This track debuted nationally on December 31, 2010, when they performed it on MuchMusic's show NewMusicLive and subsequently the CityTV New Year's Eve Bash at Nathan Phillips Square in Toronto later that evening. The televised performance attracted viewers from across the nation.

In 2011, These Kids Wear Crowns toured Australia.

In 2011, These Kids Wear Crowns filmed music videos for their singles Jumpstart, I Wanna Dance With Somebody, and Lifetime. The group's 2011 album debuted at No. 31.

In March 2011, These Kids Wear Crowns did a Canada-wide tour with Fefe Dobson. In May/June 2011, These Kids Wear Crowns did their first overseas performances in Singapore at Music Matters alongside Simple Plan.

In Summer 2011, These Kids Wear Crowns are touring across Canada once again performing at various festivals across the country.

In December 2011, These Kids Wear Crowns went overseas to Singapore again to perform on 31/12/2011 for 2012 Marina Bay Countown.

They will also be touring Canada with All Time Low, Marianas Trench and Simple Plan.

The group's EP debuted at No. 141 on the Canadian Albums Chart.

These Kids Wear Crowns will be appearing on the Soundwave Festival 2012.

In January 2015, singer Alexander Johnson announced he would be running for Parliament as a member of the Libertarian Party of Canada for the riding of Chilliwack-Hope.

The band is currently in the process of recording their second album.

On November 17, 2015, These Kids Wear Crowns released their second studio album, the rock-oriented "Still Having Fun", preceded by the single "The Best Is Yet To Come".

Discography

Albums

Singles from album Jumpstart

Music videos

References

External links
Vimeo: These Kids Wear Crowns "Jumpstart" (Colin Minihan)

Canadian pop punk groups
Musical groups established in 2009
Musical groups from British Columbia
Chilliwack
Canadian alternative rock groups
2009 establishments in British Columbia
Canadian power pop groups
Canadian pop rock music groups